Lizoainibar-Arriasgoiti (basque) or Lizoáin-Arriasgoiti (castillian) is a town and municipality located in the province and autonomous community of Navarre, northern Spain.

Municipalities in Navarre